Odlums Group is an Irish food processing and marketing company owned entirely by Valeo Foods, which is backed by Origin Enterprises and CapVest Limited, a European investment group.  It manufactures and retails a number of products under the Odlums name as well as McCann's Steel Cut Irish Oatmeal.

History

A flour mill operated by William Odlum, one of three Odlum brothers, in Maryborough (now Portlaoise) began operation in 1845. Odlum was succeeded by his two sons, William P. and Richard Odlum, and the company became known as W.P. & R. Odlum.  In the early 20th century, the company operated as many as nine mills but consolidation reduced that number to the current three flour mills in Dublin, Cork, and Portarlington The oatmeal mill in Sallins was closed at the end of 2013.  The company remained in family hands until 1988.  In 2007, Origin Enterprises which previously had a 50% stake in the Odlums Group, acquired full control of Odlums from the state-sponsored Greencore Group. In 2010, Batchelors, a manufacturer and retail category partner, and Origin Foods, the food division of Irish-based, Origin Enterprises Plc, merged to create Valeo Foods.

Products
Odlums manufactures and retails a number of flour and cereal related products under the Odlums name.  These include quick porridges, cereal snacks, health foods, and baking flours and mixes.  Odlums also customises flours for wholesale to bakers.  In addition to Odlums branded products, the group manufactured and sold McCann's Steel Cut Irish Oatmeal and other similar oat products with the McCann's brand until it sold the brand in 2008 to Sturm Foods.

See also
Aryzta

Notes

External links
Odlums Group official website

Food companies of the Republic of Ireland